Orangeville Township may refer to the following places in the United States:

 Orangeville Township, Orange County, Indiana
 Orangeville Township, Michigan

See also

 Orangeville (disambiguation)

Township name disambiguation pages